CREM may refer to:
CREM, a gene which encodes for the cAMP responsive element modulator protein
Critical emergency medicine, a subspecialty of anaesthesiology focused on immediately life-threatening emergencies
Corpo Reali Equipaggi Marittimi